Sadio Lamine Sow (born 9 August 1952, Kayes) was the Minister of Foreign Affairs and International Cooperation of Mali from 24 April 2012 to 20 August 2012.

References

1952 births
Government ministers of Mali
Foreign Ministers of Mali
Living people
People from Kayes
21st-century Malian people